In automata theory, an alternating finite automaton (AFA) is a nondeterministic finite automaton whose transitions are divided into existential and universal transitions. For example, let A be an alternating automaton.
Thus, behaving like a regular nondeterministic finite automaton.

Note that due to the universal quantification a run is represented by a run tree. A accepts a word w, if there exists a run tree on w such that every path ends in an accepting state.

A basic theorem states that any AFA is equivalent to a deterministic finite automaton (DFA), hence AFAs accept exactly the regular languages.

An alternative model which is frequently used is the one where Boolean combinations are in disjunctive normal form so that, e.g.,  would represent . This representation is usually more efficient.

Alternating finite automata can be extended to accept trees in the same way as tree automata, yielding alternating tree automata.

Formal definition
An alternating finite automaton (AFA) is a 6-tuple,
, where

 is a finite set of existential states.
 is a finite set of universal states.
 is a finite set of input symbols.
 is a set of transition relations to next state .
 is the initial (start) state, such that .
 is a set of accepting (final) states such that .

The model was introduced by Chandra, Kozen and Stockmeyer.

State complexity

Even though AFA can accept exactly the regular languages, they are different from other types of finite automata in the succinctness of description, measured by the number of their states.

Chandra et al. proved that converting an -state AFA to an equivalent DFA
requires  states in the worst case. Another construction by Fellah, Jürgensen and Yu. converts an AFA with  states to a nondeterministic finite automaton (NFA) with up to  states by performing a similar kind of powerset construction as used for the transformation of an NFA to a DFA.

Computational complexity

The membership problem asks, given an AFA  and a word , whether  accepts . This problem is P-complete. This is true even on a singleton alphabet, i.e., when the automaton accepts a unary language.

The non-emptiness problem (is the language of an input AFA non-empty?), the universality problem (is the complement of the language of an input AFA empty?), and the equivalence problem (do two input AFAs recognize the same language) are PSPACE-complete for AFAs.

References

 

Finite automata